Massacre is a town in Saint Paul Parish, Dominica, with about 1,200 inhabitants. It is located on the central west coast of the island, to the north of the capital, Roseau, on the Massacre River.

History

The town is named after a massacre of Carib that happened there in 1674.

References

External links

Populated places in Dominica
Saint Paul Parish, Dominica